2007–08 Euro Hockey Tour is the 12th edition of Euro Hockey Tour. There are only four teams: Czech Republic, Finland, Russia and Sweden are competing.

Format
The tournament consists of four stages: Ceska Pojistovna Cup in Czech Republic, Karjala Tournament in Finland, Channel One Cup in Russia and LG Hockey Games in Sweden. The intervals between stages are usually from 1 month to 3 months. In each phase teams played six games.

Total standings

Standings after all 4 events

Results

Karjala Tournament
Standings

Note:Russia stand first, because they won against Sweden.

Results
All times local CET

 won the first stage of Euro Hockey Tour 2007–08 in Finland.

Channel One Cup
Standings

Results
All times local CET

 won the second stage of Euro Hockey Tour 2007-08 in Russia.

LG Hockey Games
Standings

Note:Russia stand first, because they won against Finland.

Results
All times local CET

 won the most complicated, third stage of Euro Hockey Tour 2007–08 in Sweden.

Ceska Pojistovna Cup
Standings

Results
All times local CET

External links
EHT

 
2007–08 in European ice hockey
Euro Hockey Tour